Onthophagus dama, is a species of dung beetle found in Nepal, Bhutan, India, and Sri Lanka.

Description 
This oval, compact and less convex species has an average length of about 8.5 to 11 mm. Body dark greenish, bluish-black or coppery. While its ventrum, head, and pronotum are shiny, the elytra are without shine. The dorsum are entirely without setae, and the clypeus are semi-circularly rounded. Its pronotum are finely and sparsely punctured, and has elytra with distinctly punctured striae and flat intervals. Pygidium opaque and moderately punctured. In males, the clypeus are feebly punctured, and vertex bears a pair of horns. It has very short horns, without teeth or curvature. In females, the clypeus are strongly transversely rugose.

Ecology
Adults are coprophagus, and make tunnels in fresh dungs. Frequenly seen in cow dung and human feces. They inhabited in tropical dry forest and agricultural habitats.

Gallery

References 

Scarabaeinae
Beetles of Sri Lanka
Insects described in 1798